John Joseph Paluck (May 23, 1935 – April 22, 2003) was an American football defensive lineman in the National Football League for the Washington Redskins.  He went to one Pro Bowl during his nine-year career.  Paluck played college football at the University of Pittsburgh and was drafted in the second round of the 1956 NFL Draft.

A number 2 draft pick, Paluck was lost to the military for the 1957 and 1958 seasons. He rejoined the Redskins for the 1959 season to become one of the NFL's top defensive performers. His rugged style of play earned him the nickname of "Gentle John." He scored the only touchdown of his career as a rookie, returning a fumble 76 yards against the New York Giants at Yankee Stadium.

References

1935 births
2003 deaths
People from Swoyersville, Pennsylvania
American football defensive ends
Players of American football from Pennsylvania
Eastern Conference Pro Bowl players
Pittsburgh Panthers football players
Washington Redskins players
American people of Lithuanian descent